Bruce Allan Chabner is a professor of medicine at Harvard Medical School and Director of Clinical Research at the MGH Cancer Center at Massachusetts General Hospital. His research focuses on anti-folate drugs for the treatment of cancer.

Personal life 
Chabner grew up in Shelbyville, Illinois as the son of a general practitioner. He is married to Davi‐Ellen Rosenzweig and has two children.

Education and career 

Chabner completed his undergraduate education at Yale University in 1961 and received his MD from Harvard Medical School in 1965.  He entered the Public Health Service and started working at the National Cancer Institute where he studied under Joseph Bertino. He left the NIH in 1995 after 27 years at NCI and 13 years as the director of the division of Cancer Treatment at NCI to join the faculty at Mass General Hospital as chief of hematology and oncology.

His work at NIH led to the development of Taxol, a commonly prescribed breast cancer drug.

Awards 
 1976 Elected Member of the American Society for Clinical Investigation
 1985 David A. Karnofsky Memorial Award and Lecture, American Society of Clinical Oncology
 1986 Distinguished Oncologist Award, Dayton Oncology Society
 1986 Melville Jacobs Award, American Radium Society
 1987 Meritorious Service Medal, U.S. Public Health Service
 1996 Kantor Family Prize for Cancer Research Excellence
 1998 AACR-Bruce F. Cain Memorial Award
 2005 Paul Calabresi Award, National Cancer Institute
 2006 Member of the National Cancer Advisory Board, National Cancer Institute
 2013 Honoree, The One Hundred, Massachusetts General Hospital Cancer Center
 2015 Elected Fellow of the AACR Academy

References 

Fellows of the AACR Academy
American oncologists
Harvard Medical School alumni
People from Shelbyville, Illinois
Living people
Yale University alumni
American public health doctors
Year of birth missing (living people)